The NATO Tiger Association or the Association of Tiger Squadrons was established in 1961. Promoted by French Defence minister Pierre Messmer, its role is to promote solidarity between NATO air forces. It is not, though, part of the formal NATO structure.

The 79th Tactical Fighter Squadron (TFS) of the United States Air Forces in Europe took the initiative and on 19 July 1961, they invited No. 74 Squadron RAF and EC (Fighter Squadron) 1/12 Cambresis of the French Armée de l'air to RAF Woodbridge in England. France was then a full military member of NATO.

As of May 2016, the squadrons included in the Association are 24 full members, 10 honorary members, and 7 disbanded members, all of which have a tiger as part of its squadron crest. As well as being opportunities for NATO air forces to share ideas and experiences, the 'Tiger Meets' are also public relations exercises for NATO. NATO aircraft are often brightly painted with tiger stripes.

Members
The following 24 squadrons are full members of the association.
  Austrian Air Force
 1 Jet Training Squadron
 2. Squadron/Fighter Wing
  Belgian Air Force
 31 Smaldeel
  Czech Air Force
 211. taktická letka (211th Tactical Squadron)
 221. vrtulníková letka (221st Helicopter Squadron)
  French Air Force
 Escadron de Chasse et d'Expérimentation 05/330
 Escadron de Chasse 3/30 Lorraine
  French Navy
 Flottille 11F
  German Air Force
 Taktisches Luftwaffengeschwader 51 "Immelmann"
 Taktisches Luftwaffengeschwader 74 "Bavarian Tigers"
  Hellenic Air Force
 335 Squadron "Tigers"
  Hungarian Air Force
 59/1 Squadron
  Italian Air Force
 XII Gruppo 
 21 Gruppo (387th and 388th Flights)
  (NATO Airborne Early Warning Force)
 Squadron 1
  Royal Netherlands Air Force
 313 Squadron
  Royal Norwegian Air Force
 338 Skvadron
  Polish Air Force
 6 Squadron
  Portuguese Air Force
 Esquadra 301 "Jaguares"
  Swiss Air Force
 Fliegerstaffel 11
  Spanish Air Force
 142 Escuadrón
 Ala 15
  Turkish Air Force
 192 Filo
  Royal Air Force
 230 Squadron
  Royal Navy
 814 Naval Air Squadron

Honorary members
  Royal Canadian Air Force
 439 CSS
  Indian Air Force
1 Squadron
  Slovak Air Force
 1 Lt (Bojova letka)
  United States Air Force
 37th Bomb Squadron
  United States Air Force
 79th Fighter Squadron
  United States Air Force
 120th Fighter Squadron
  United States Air Force
 391st Fighter Squadron
  United States Air Force
 393rd Bomb Squadron
  United States Air National Guard
141st Air Refueling Squadron
  United States Navy
 VP-8

Probationary members
 none

Former members
The following squadrons were formerly members of the NATO Tiger Association until their disbanding by their respective organization.
  German Air Force
 Aufklärungsgeschwader 52
 Jagdbombergeschwader 32 (disbanded March 2013)
 Jagdbomberstaffel 431
  French Air Force
 Escadron de Chasse 1/12
 Escadron de Chasse 1/7 "Provence"
  Royal Norwegian Air Force
 336 Squadron
  Royal Air Force
 74 (F) Squadron
  United States Air Force
 53rd Fighter Squadron

Tiger Meets 
The most publicly visible aspect of the NATO Tiger Association are the annual Tiger Meets, during which member squadrons gather for exercises, conferences, and public relations.

Bibliography

 Heuvel, Coen van den  & Tuyn, Jac van. Tiger Meet, the 25th Anniversary 'NATO' Tiger Meet, Osprey, 1986, 978-0-8504-5703-2.

References

External links

 NATO Tiger Association website

Organizations related to NATO
Military excellence competitions